Xike is a railway station in New Taipei, Taiwan served by Taiwan Railways. Located near Xizhi's technology park, it experiences heavy traffic during the morning and early evening rush hours.

Construction
Construction started in June 2005 and finished on schedule in December 2007. During planning the names South Xizhi Station (南汐止站) and Xizhi Technology Park (汐科園區站) were mooted, but eventually the name Xike Station (汐科站) was chosen.

Usage
Media reports have highlighted Xike Station as part of the "MRT-ization" plan for Taiwan's urban railways, offering convenient transport for commuters, spurring new residential construction, and raising property prices in the vicinity of the station.
This station only stops Local Trains.

Future expansion
The planned Minsheng–Xizhi line of the Taipei Metro (MRT) system would see Xike Station transformed into a TRA and MRT interchange station.

Around the station
Farglory U-Town (next to the station)

Acer Inc. Headquarters (300m to the south)

Oriental Science Park (450m to the southeast)

See also
 List of railway stations in Taiwan

References

External links 

TRA Xike Station 
Taiwan Railways Administration

2007 establishments in Taiwan
Railway stations served by Taiwan Railways Administration
Railway stations in New Taipei